Ru, sometimes referred as , , and , is a form of traditional Chinese upper garment, or coat, or jacket, which typically has a right closure; however, some of them can also have a front central opening. It is a daily upper garment for women of the Han Chinese ethnic. It can be worn in combination with a skirt in a style called , or a pair of trousers in a style called .

Clothing style which overlaps and closes to the right originated in China and are referred as being . Since then the  had been one of the major symbols of the Sino Kingdom and eventually spread throughout Asia. The structure of the jackets worn in the late Qing shared some features of those worn by the Han ethnics in the Ming dynasty. Although the structure of the jacket evolved with time, these forms of jackets continued to be worn in the Republic of China. After the 1930s, these forms of upper garment lost popularity and decreased in use, as qipao and Western dress became more popular. They regained popularity in the 21st century following the Hanfu movement.

Terminology

The term  generally refers to clothing. In ancient times, the term  referred to an upper outer garment.

/ / /  

and  

The  can refer to both a long or short jacket. The  also had different names depending on its characteristics, such as its length and the presence or absence of lining.

The , when referring to a short jacket, can be found with either short or long sleeves. In the Mawangdui Silk Manuscripts, the character 《》refers to a 'short coat'.

In the Han dynasty, the  could be unlined, lined or padded.

The term  appears in a Sui dynasty rime dictionary called , published in 601 AD and can be translated as "padded coat", but it can also refer to a lined upper garment. The term  was sometimes used to refer to thicker forms of jacket which could be used as winter clothing.

/  

The term , sometimes pronounced , also exists and is typically associated with the upper garment worn in military clothing called .

Construction and design

Collar designs 

The  is a form of jacket or coat, which typically closes to the right and is described as being . The  can also be classified as  when it is cross-collared closing on the right side,  when it has an overlapping big oblique lapel,  when it has a slanted, big lapel,  when it is squared collared, and  when it is round collared. The standing collars started to be incorporated in upper garments by the late Ming dynasty.

Bodice 
The length of the bodice may vary; it can be waist-length or knee-length.

Slits can also be found at both sides of the lower hems of the bodice.

Sleeves 
The length of the sleeves can vary in length, such as wrist-length and elbow length.

The shapes of the sleeves can also vary, such as big sleeves, narrow sleeves, large cuffs, mandarin sleeves, flared sleeves.

Cultural significance

Symbol of Chinese civilization 
Clothing style which overlaps and closes to the right originated in China. Chinese robes and jackets must cover the right part in a style called . The  closure is an important symbol of the Han Chinese ethnicity. The  had been one of the major symbols of the Sino Kingdom, and eventually spread throughout Asia.

Composition of  
The structure of the  may have some differences and variations in terms of features depending on time period and styles of upper garment. For example, a style of Ming dynasty  have the following features:

 Left side of the garment;
 Right side of the garment;
 Xiu (袖) - Sleeves; it is composed of the side of the body and the mei; sleeves can come in various shapes and each shape has a specific name to describe it based on its shape;
 Mei (袂) - a panel of fabric attached to the left side of the garment, between the Ge (袼) and the Qu (袪);
 Ren (衽) - A side panel forming the chest part area; the left-side covers the right-side, youren (右衽);
 Jin (襟) - lapel (can be found on both sides; the right lapel is hidden);
 Qu (袪) - Sleeves cuffs for the wrists; can be narrow or loose;
 Ge (袼) - Sleeve root, the part where the sleeve is attached to the body of the garment;
 Lacing/ribbons - used to tied and closed the garment;
 Du (裻) - Middle seam of the clothes; it is where the Ren is sewed to side of the garment; there is also a middle seam at the back of the garments which joins the back of the left and right side of the garment called Zhongfeng (中缝);
 Huling (护领)- a collar guard, it is shorter than the actual collar and is used to prevent the collar from getting dirty or wear off.

Chinese-barbarian dichotomy 

This can be found in the Analects where Confucius himself praised Guan Zhong for preventing the weakened Zhou dynasty from becoming barbarians:
Unbound hair and coats which were closed on the left side were associated with the clothing customs of the northern nomadic ethnic groups which were considered as barbarians by the Han Chinese.

Exceptions 
However, the  rule was not always respected: for example, in some areas (such as Northern Hebei) in the 10th century, some ethnic Han Chinese could also be found wearing  clothing. It was also common for the Han Chinese women to adopt  under the reign of foreign nationalities, such as in the Yuan dynasty; the use of  also continued in some areas of the Ming dynasty despite being Han-Chinese ruled dynasty, which is an atypical feature. Some non-Chinese ethnicities who also adopted -style sometimes maintain their  lapels, such as the Khitans in the Liao dynasty.

Funeral practices 
The only moment Han Chinese is supposed to use  is when they dressed their deceased. However, if  surpasses  (i.e. -style), then clothing becomes the clothing worn by the deceased. It is therefore typically taboo in Chinese clothing for a living person to wear .

History 

Clothing style with  closure originated in China. The long  could reach the knee-level whereas the short ru was waist-length. The  could be found unlined, lined or padded.

Shang dynasty 

The  started to be worn in the Shang dynasty.

Zhou dynasty 

Han dynasty and Three Kingdom period 
In the Han dynasty, short waist-length  could be worn with trousers or skirts by men and women respectively.

This  was worn by men and women and became popular as it was more convenient for wearing.

Jin dynasty, Northern and Southern dynasties period

Sui and Tang dynasties

Tang dynasty 

Some jackets in Tang dynasty could be found with narrow sleeves, while other upper garments could be found with loose sleeves.

Song dynasty 

Song dynasty, women wore  jackets and  jackets. The short ru was a daily garment item for women; the closures of the short ru were found either on the left or right of the front of the garment.

Clothing worn by the Northern Song dynasty people living in Kaifeng are depicted in the on the painting Qingming Festival on the River by Zhang Zeduan. This painting depicts the clothing worn by people holding different social status, ranks, and occupation: the jackets worn as outer garments were all short, about knee-length or shorter, when worn by coolies, pedlars, peasants, and boat people and children who peddled dried fruits wore short white shan.

Liao dynasty 

 
Song dynasty-style fashion, including  jackets, continued to be worn by both Han Chinese and non-elite Khitan women in the Liao dynasty; these jackets were waist-length.

Yuan dynasty 

Han Chinese women also wore , a form of lined jacket, typically over a long-length  underneath as winter clothing.

Ming dynasty 

Ming dynasty portrait paintings showing Chinese women dressing in  jackets appeared to be characteristic of ancestral portraits from the province of Shanxi and most likely in the areas neighbouring the province.

According to the Discourse of Northern Learning (Pukhak ŭi; 北學議: 완역정본) by Pak Chega (1750–1805) who visited the Qing dynasty in 1778, in the Ming dynasty, Chinese women's upper garment barely covered the waist during the Hongzhi era (1488–1505); their upper garments then gradually became longer and reached below the knee-level during the Zhengde era (1506–1521). Pak Chega based his description of Chinese women's clothing by using the Records of Daily Study (Rizhilu) by Gu Yanwu (1613–1682), a scholar from the late Ming and early Qing dynasties. The standup collar were closed with interlocking buttons made of gold and silver, called . The appearance of interlocking buckle promoted the emergence and the popularity of the standup collar and the Chinese jacket with buttons at the front, and laid the foundation of the use of Chinese knot buckles. In women garments of the Ming dynasty, the standup collar with gold and silver  became one of the most distinctive and popular form of clothing structure; it became commonly used in women's clothing reflecting the conservative concept of Ming women's chastity by keeping their bodies covered and due to the climate changes during the Ming dynasty (i.e. the average temperature was low in China). The  is typically worn with a skirt, called .

Qing dynasty 

As Han women were not forced to change into Manchu clothing in the Qing dynasty, Han women of the Qing dynasty followed the style of female jacket worn in the Ming dynasty. The Han Chinese women carefully maintained their pure Han Chinese ethnicity and did not wear Manchu clothing. Over time, the Ming dynasty customs were gradually forgotten. The clothing of the Han and the Manchu eventually influenced each other. However, Manchu women and Han Chinese women never emulated each other's clothing; and as a result, by the end of the nineteenth century, Manchu and Han Chinese women had maintained distinctive clothing.

In the early Qing, Han women continued wearing Ming dynasty hanfu; in the South, the jiaoling ao and shan continued to be worn with long skirts by most women while in the North, trousers were more common.

In the mid-Qing clothing, fashionable styles were associated to those worn in the late 16th and early 17th century. According to the Discourse of Northern Learning (Pukhak ŭi; 北學議: 완역정본) by Pak Chega (1750–1805) who visited the Qing dynasty in 1778, Chinese women wore upper and lower garments which were similar to those worn in ancient paintings. Pak described the jackets had collars which were round and narrow and were fastened just below the chin; he also described them as being typically long enough to conceal the entire body although in some cases, the jacket would be long enough to be just below the knee-level.  Pak also observed that the Chinese women's clothing preserved the old traditions (which were mostly intact) and which he contrasted with the Joseon women's clothing trend which he claimed to be taking more after Mongolian in style, an influence which he attributed to the close relationship between Goryeo and the Yuan dynasty and continued to exist in Joseon during his lifetime.

After the Mid-Qing dynasty, Manchu clothing, called qizhuang, started to influence the women's hanfu. In the late 18th and 19th century, there was a dramatic shift in fashion aesthetics. The trend in this period was characterized on the emphasis on decorative trims and accessories which were modular and could be easily produced, purchased and then applied on the clothing (including robes, jackets, and skirts); those forms of modular features included collars, sleeve-bands and border decorations. The borders decoration in contrasting colours were used throughout the clothing history of China and were recorded early on in history (e.g. in the Liji). During this period, auspicious symbols and narrative scenery were especially made into embroidered roundels and borders and became fashionable in Han Chinese women's clothing; this new trend was an influence of the late imperial secularization of arts and culture on textiles. They were also lavished with embroideries which were based on the Chinese symbolic system, which was itself based on Chinese language, mythology, customs, and literature, and belief system (e.g. Confucianist and Taoist motifs). The wide sleeves used in the upper garment were a heritage of the Ming dynasty and a distinctive feature which differentiated Hanfu from Manchu clothing. In terms of length, the long jacket was about below the hip level or at the knee level but were never as long as the Manchu robes, it was however longer than the waist-length jacket which appeared to have fallen from popularity during the 18th century.

The  continued to be worn. In the late Qing, these  had neither darts nor shoulder stitching; the front and back panels are connected by the shoulder, and the left and right pieces are more or less symmetrical. It has a front centre closure and then curves crossover to the right before secured with frog buttons in a style called . The front closing, collar, hem, and sleeves cuff have edging of contrasting pipings and side slits. The jackets could also be decorated with  appliqué.  

There was also a special form of ao called mangao,which was typically used as part of a type of Chinese wedding dress attire.

The  (jackets with front opening) were also worn. The  in the 19th century could be round neck with no collar or have small stand-up collars.The  continued to be worn in the Qing dynasty even in the 19th century by children.

Republic of China 
These high collars were gradually lowered. After the May 4th Movement, these high collars were abandoned due to their inconvenience. In the 1920s, the jackets had curved lower hem at the waist-hip region and low standing collar; it was a component of the  ). After the 1930s, these forms of upper garments lost popularity and decreased in use, as they were replaced by qipao and Western dress.

21st century 
Following the Hanfu movement in 2003, many various forms, shapes, and styles of Hanfu upper garments have reappeared and regained popularity.

Influences and derivatives

East Asia 

The  closure was adopted by the Japanese in 718 through the Yoro Code which stipulated that all robes had to be closed from the left to the right in a typical Chinese way 

The  closure was also adopted by the Koreans during the Three Kingdoms period who changed the closure of their jeogori from left to right by imitating Chinese jackets; the right closure is a feature which still exists in present-days hanbok. Initially, the jeogori closed at the front, then switched to a left closure before eventually closing to the right side. Closing the jeogori to the right has become standard practice since the sixth century AD. King Hyonjong of Goryeo had been said to have composed a poem in 1018 stating, "Had it not been for Kang, evermore would our coats on the left be bound", when Kang Kamch'an won against the invading Khitan. The Chinese Ming dynasty also bestowed the ceremonial attire and daily clothing to the Joseon queens from the reign of King Munjong to the reign of King Seonjo whenever a new king was enthroned; the bestowed clothing included  (襖, called o in Korea), qun (裙, called gun in Korean), and dansam (unlined jacket).

The Vietnamese used to wear the áo giao lĩnh (cross-collared robe) which were identical to those worn by Han Chinese people before adopting the precursor of the aodai (known as Áo ngũ thân), a loose-fitting shirt with a stand-up collar and a diagonal right side closure which run from the neck to the armpit and trousers. The standing-up collar and diagonal right closure are two features inspired by Chinese and Manchu clothing. The change in upper garment style along with the adoption of Chinese-style trousers was decreed by the Nguyen Lords who ruled the south region of Vietnam and who wanted to differentiate their people from those living in the north and were ruled by the Trinh Lords.The people of Ryukyu wore cross-collar upper garment called dujin (胴衣; ドゥジン), which was only worn by members of the Ryukyu royal family and by the upper-class warrior families. The old-style dujin was initially more Chinese in style before gradually becoming more Japanese in style.

America and Europe 

British  fashion had incorporated key elements from the construction design of Chinese clothing, including the use of wide sleeves and side closure; these designs were then adapted to meet the aesthetic tastes of Europeans.

In volume 57, The Delineator described it as being "Ladies' Chinese dressing", and as having "a strong suggestion of the Orient". The Ladies' Chinese dressing sac #3920 appeared at least a year earlier and was published in Volume 56 of The Delineator of 1900. Likewise, Japanese Kimono-style with wrap closure, also influenced American summer fashion in the early 1900s; these became known as Misses' or girls' Japanese wrapper or lounging-robe.

There are also photographic evidences of Chinese robes being used outside its wearer's home as fashion items with little or no adaption from the 1920s. The loosening of women's fashion found in the 1920s loose-fitting fashion, especially the disappearance of nipped-in corset, appears to have also been influenced by the loose lines and roomy armholes of the traditional Chinese robes and jackets along with other factors, such as the experience of freedoms of elite women at that time, the sportswear-designs of Chanel, and the garment designs by Paul Poiret who designed Middle-Eastern inspired garments.

Usage 

 Shanku
 Ruqun

Related content 

Áo giao lĩnh
Banbi
 Bijia
 Beizi
 Paofu

See also 
 Hanfu
 List of Hanfu
 Garment collars in Hanfu
 Hufu

Notes

References 

Chinese traditional clothing